Villa Angela-St. Joseph High School is a private Roman Catholic college-preparatory high school located in Cleveland, Ohio, United States. The school's name is commonly abbreviated VASJ. It was formed by the 1990 merger of Villa Angela Academy (all girls) and St. Joseph High School (all boys). It is owned by the Catholic Diocese of Cleveland. The school's core values are grounded in those of the religious orders which had administered the two predecessor schools: the Society of Mary (Marianists) (Saint Joseph High School) and the Ursulines (Villa Angela Academy).

History

Villa Angela Academy
Villa Angela Academy was founded in the mid-1870s, as a boarding school and academy for girls, by the Ursuline Sisters of Cleveland on property they had purchased on the southern shore of Lake Erie at the mouth of Euclid Creek.  The school moved into a new building in 1972.  Their athletic teams were nicknamed the Skylarks (Larks)  Villa Angela Academy had over 6,000 graduates.

St. Joseph High School
St. Joseph High School was opened in 1950 on the site of Boulevard Hospital, a general hospital which closed in 1937 (originally, the Cunningham Sanitarium -  a facility designed to use pressurized atmosphere as an aid in the treatment of disease).  Bishop Edward Francis Hoban had asked the Society of Mary (Marianists) from Dayton, Ohio to administer the school.  The school's mascot was the Viking due to the school's proximity to Lake Erie. St. Joseph has over 10,000 graduates.

Villa Angela - St. Joseph High School
In 1988, the Diocese announced plans to merge these two schools into a new co-educational school that would serve the needs of the east side of Cleveland.  The new school would keep both schools' names and traditions.  It would be named "Villa Angela - St. Joseph High School" and be located at the St. Joseph building.

The mascot would remain the Viking.

Academics
VASJ has several academic programs including:
 College Preparatory Program
 Honors/Advanced Placement Program
 General Skills Program
 Learning disability Program

Athletics

VASJ competes in Ohio High School Athletic Association (OHSAA).

VASJ competes independent of an athletic conference. VASJ was previously a member of the original Crown Conference from 1967-1980 (as St. Joseph), the North Coast League from 2004-2020, and the second iteration of the Crown Conference from 2021-2022

State championships
 Boys basketball - 1991, 1992, 1994, 1995, 2013, 2015, 2017
VASJ is the only Ohio high school to have won boys basketball state titles within all four OHSAA divisions.
 Girls basketball - 1999
 Boys cross country – 1965^, 1966^, 1968^, 1969^
 Football – 1989^
 Softball - 1995, 1996, 1997
 Girls volleyball - 2001, 2005
 Wrestling – 1990^

^ Championship won by St. Joseph High School before merging with Villa Angela Academy.

Sports offered
Baseball (boys)  
Basketball (boys & girls) 
Bowling (co-ed) 
Cheerleading (co-ed) 
Cross country (boys & girls)
Dance (co-ed) 
Football (boys) 
Golf (co-ed) 
Soccer (boys & girls) 
Softball (girls)
Swimming (boys & girls) 
Track (boys & girls) 
Volleyball (boys & girls) 
Wrestling (boys)

Notable alumni
Notable alumni from before the 1990 merger are identified with "SJHS" for St. Joseph High School and "VAA" for Villa Angela Academy.

Football
Abyss - 1988 - SJHS
Andy Cannavino - 1977 - SJHS
London Fletcher - 1993
Bob Golic - 1975 - SJHS
Mike Golic - 1981 - SJHS
Elvis Grbac - 1988 - SJHS
Desmond Howard - 1988 - SJHS
Rich Moore - 1965 - SJHS
Tom Schoen - 1964 - SJHS
Greg Urbas - SJHS

Basketball
Carlton Bragg Jr. - 2015
Kevin Edwards - 1983 - SJHS
Clark Kellogg - 1979 - SJHS
Stan Kimbrough - 1984 - SJHS
David Lighty - 2006
Tony Miller - 1991
 Dererk Pardon - 2015
Eric Riley - 1988 - SJHS

Politics
Mary Jo Kilroy - 1967 - VAA
Dennis E. Eckart - 1968 - SJHS

News/Media
Kelly O'Donnell - 1983 - VAA

Law
Tim Misny - 1973 - SJHS

References

External links
 

High schools in Cuyahoga County, Ohio
Education in Cleveland
Catholic secondary schools in Ohio
Educational institutions established in 1990
Educational institutions established in 1878
Educational institutions established in 1950
Euclid, Ohio
1878 establishments in Ohio
1950 establishments in Ohio
1990 establishments in Ohio
Ursuline schools
Marianist schools
Collinwood
Roman Catholic Diocese of Cleveland